John Alfred Jarvey (born September 14, 1956) is a former United States district judge of the United States District Court for the Southern District of Iowa.

Education and career

Born in Minneapolis, Minnesota, Jarvey received a Bachelor of Science degree in accounting from the University of Akron in 1978 and a Juris Doctor from Drake University Law School in 1981. He also attended Concordia College.

After law school, Jarvey served as a law clerk to Judge Donald E. O'Brien of the United States District Court for the Northern District of Iowa from 1981 to 1983. He was a trial attorney of the Criminal Division of the United States Department of Justice from 1983 to 1987. As a prosecutor, he specialized in fraud in the pharmaceutical industry. He taught trial advocacy at the University of Iowa College of Law and mock trial at Cedar Rapids Washington High School. He is married to Mary Jarvey, a piano teacher.

Federal judicial service

Jarvey was a United States magistrate judge of the United States District Court for the Northern District of Iowa from 1987 to 2007. As a magistrate judge, Jarvey conducted over 400 mediations. On January 9, 2007, Jarvey was nominated by President George W. Bush to a seat on the United States District Court for the Southern District of Iowa vacated by Ronald Earl Longstaff. The American Bar Association rated him unanimously as "well-qualified". Jarvey was confirmed by the United States Senate on March 8, 2007, and received his commission on March 14, 2007. He served as Chief Judge from March 1, 2015 to February 10, 2022. Cases he oversaw included the Kent Sorenson bribery scandal. Jarvey retired from active service on March 18, 2022.

As Chief Judge, Jarvey was a principal force behind the building of a new federal courthouse in Des Moines. He also regularly sat by designation on other district courts, especially the United States District Court for the District of Arizona.

References

External links

1956 births
Living people
21st-century American judges
American prosecutors
Drake University Law School alumni
Judges of the United States District Court for the Southern District of Iowa
Lawyers from Minneapolis
United States Department of Justice lawyers
United States district court judges appointed by George W. Bush
United States magistrate judges
University of Akron alumni